The 2019 FIVB Volleyball Women's U20 World Championship will be the twentieth edition of the FIVB Volleyball Women's U20 World Championship, contested by the women's national teams under the age of 20 of the members of the  (FIVB), the sport's global governing body. The final tournament was held in Mexico from 12 to 21 July 2019. Mexico played hosts for this event for the fourth time.

The finals involved 16 teams, of which 15 came through qualifying competitions, while the host nation qualified automatically. Of the 16 teams, 15 had also appeared in the previous tournament in 2017, while Rwanda made its first appearances at an FIVB Volleyball Women's U20 World Championship.

China is the defending champions, having won their third title in Mexico.

Qualification
A total of 16 teams qualified for the final tournament. In addition to Mexico, who qualified automatically as the hosts, another 10 teams qualified via six separate continental tournaments while the remaining 5 teams qualified via the FIVB Junior World Ranking.

Pools composition

First round
The draw was held in León, Mexico on 18 June 2019. Mexico as a host country team were seeded in the top position of pool A. The top seven teams from World ranking as per January 2019 were seed in serpentine system in first two rows. The eight remaining teams were drawn in next two rows. Numbers in brackets denote the World ranking.

Draw

Second round

Venues

Referees
There were sixteen referees from 5 continental confederations in this tournament.

AVC (1)
 Irina Kabulbekova

CAVB (2)
 Marthe Clémence Eyike
 Abderrazek Hariz

CEV (4)
 Sinisa Isajlovic
 Sabine Witte
 Roy Goren
 Sanja Miklosic

CSV (4)
 Angela Grass
 Misael Galindo Reyez
 Rocio Aida Huarcaya Lopez
 José Blanco Gonto

NORCECA (5) 
 Andrew Robb
 Lourdes Perez Perez
 Nestor Bienvenido Mateo Perez

 Pablo Mendoza Sanchez

Squads

Pool standing procedure
 Number of matches won
 Match points
 Sets ratio
 Points ratio
 If the tie continues as per the point ratio between two teams, the priority will be given to the team which won the last match between them. When the tie in points ratio is between three or more teams, a new classification of these teams in the terms of points 1, 2 and 3 will be made taking into consideration only the matches in which they were opposed to each other.

Match won 3–0 or 3–1: 3 match points for the winner, 0 match points for the loser
Match won 3–2: 2 match points for the winner, 1 match point for the loser

First round

Pool A

|}

|}

Pool B

|}

|}

Pool C

|}

|}

Pool D

|}

|}

Second round

Pool E

|}

|}

Pool F

|}

|}

Pool G

|}

|}

Pool H

|}

|}

Final round
All times are Central Daylight Time Zone (UTC−05:00).

Classification 13th–16th

13th–16th semifinals

|}

15th-place match

|}

13th-place match

|}

Classification 9th–12th

9th–12th semifinals

|}

11th-place match

|}

9th-place match

|}

Classification 5th–8th

5th–8th semifinals

|}

7th-place match

|}

5th-place match

|}

Final four

Semifinals

|}

3rd-place match

|}

Final

|}

Final standing

Awards

Most Valuable Player
 Mayu Ishikawa
Best Setter
 Tsukasa Nakagawa
Best Outside Spikers
 Haruna Soga
 Mayu Ishikawa

Best Middle Blockers
 Yulia Brovkina
 Merve Atlier
Best Opposite Spiker
 Terry Enweonwu
Best Libero
 Ni Feifan

See also
2019 FIVB Volleyball Men's U21 World Championship

References

External links
Official website

FIVB Volleyball Women's U20 World Championship
FIVB Volleyball Women's U20 World Championship
International volleyball competitions hosted by Mexico
2019 in Mexican sports
FIVB Volleyball Women's U20 World Championship